Wyethia arizonica, the Arizona mule's ears, is a plant species native to Arizona, Colorado, New Mexico and Utah.

Flower heads are 1-4 per plant, with yellow flowers.

References

arizonica
Flora of Utah
Flora of Colorado
Flora of Arizona
Flora of New Mexico
Flora without expected TNC conservation status